Hal Hays LeSueur (September 3, 1901 or 1903 – May 3, 1963) was an American actor and the brother of Oscar-winning film star Joan Crawford.

Background 
Hal LeSueur was born at 326 Rivas Street, San Antonio, Texas, the first child of Thomas E. LeSueur (died 1938) and Anna Bell Johnson (died 1958). His older half-sister was Daisy McConnell and his younger sister was Lucille Fay LeSueur, later the film star Joan Crawford. After Thomas LeSueur had abandoned the family, Anna wed businessman Henry J. Cassin (1868–1922). The family lived in Lawton, Oklahoma, then moved to Kansas City, Missouri, in 1917. Hal LeSueur moved from Kansas City around 1928 to Los Angeles. He found work in the stock department at MGM in bit parts or as an extra.

Marriages 
He was married twice. His first wife was Jessie Burress (1904–1977). They wed on October 21, 1922, in Kansas City, Missouri (his age given as 21) and divorced in 1929. His second wife was Kasha Haroldi (1907–1992). Hal and Kasha married in Santa Ana, California, on September 16, 1931, with Hal's age given as 30. They had one child, a daughter, named Joan Crawford LeSueur (1933–1999), who was named after Hal's sister and became a dancer on Broadway, known professionally as Joan Lowe. Kasha and Hal LeSueur divorced in 1935. She won custody of their daughter. She remarried and became Mrs. Kasha Lowe; her daughter became Joan Lowe, the name by which she was known professionally, later Mrs. Joan Fowler.

Controversy 
On November 9, 1935, LeSueur was in a head-on collision at the top of Cahuenga Pass. The other car caught fire and the three people inside, Earl Gose, who was driving, his wife, Golda, and his sister, Grace, were pulled from the blaze. Their car burned to a charred hulk. LeSueur suffered severe cuts and bruises on his hands, face, arms and legs. The other people were also seriously injured. All were taken to a hospital in Hollywood. The injuries of Grace Gose proved fatal three days later. His mother, Anna, and his ex-wife, Kasha, accompanied him to the coroner's inquest on November 15. Earl and Golda Gose were unable to appear. LeSueur testified that he was driving near the center of the highway when the other car suddenly pulled out from behind another car into his lane and he was unable to avoid the collision. The Coroner's jury exonerated him of blame for the crash, returning a verdict of accidental death.

In February 1936, Earl and Golda Gose sued him, seeking $86,400 in damages. Golda, who was taken into court on a hospital stretcher, which was placed before the jury box, testified that LeSueur was driving on the wrong side of Cahuenga Boulevard when his car collided with theirs. LeSueur not only denied responsibility for the accident, but in his cross-complaint for $10,000 charged that the crash came about through Gose's negligent driving. The suit was then abruptly dropped, however, when a settlement was reached. LeSueur agreed to pay them $8,500, one tenth of what they had originally sought.

Later years 
Tired of being an uncredited actor in the films on which he worked, he decided to try his hand at make-up work at MGM for a while. When he left that job, he worked as a sporting goods salesman. LeSueur made one final movie appearance, playing a reporter in Jeanne Eagels (1957). He made one TV appearance in an episode of the series State Trooper, titled No Fancy Cowboys, which aired on March 13, 1957. When he left the sporting goods business, LeSueur began working as a desk clerk at a Los Angeles hotel, and supplemented his income working as a switchboard operator at the motel where he lived.

Death 
Hal LeSueur died of a ruptured appendix at the Los Angeles General Hospital. He was interred in Forest Lawn Cemetery, Glendale, California. His sister reportedly sent him telegrams from New York to the hospital before he died, but did not attend his funeral.

Filmography

References

External links 

1900s births
1963 deaths
People from Lawton, Oklahoma
American male film actors
American male television actors
Male actors from Kansas City, Missouri
Male actors from Oklahoma
Male actors from San Antonio
Burials at Forest Lawn Memorial Park (Glendale)
20th-century American male actors
Age controversies
American people of Swedish descent
American people of French descent
Switchboard operators
United States Army personnel of World War II